The Northern Marianas elect a governor and a legislature. The governor is elected for four-year term by the people. The Northern Mariana Islands Commonwealth Legislature has two chambers. The House of Representatives has 20 members (18 prior to 2007), elected for a two-year term in single-seat constituencies. The Senate has 9 members, elected for a two-year term in single-seat constituencies.
The Northern Marianas has a multi-party system, with two or three strong parties and a third party that is electorally successful.

See also
 Electoral calendar
 Electoral system
Political party strength in the Northern Mariana Islands

External links
 NMI Election Commission
 Adam Carr's Election Archive